Crime on Their Hands is a 1948 short subject directed by Edward Bernds starring American slapstick comedy team The Three Stooges (Moe Howard, Larry Fine and Shemp Howard). It is the 112th entry in the series released by Columbia Pictures starring the comedians, who released 190 shorts for the studio between 1934 and 1959.

Plot
The Stooges are janitors at a newspaper who stumble on a hot story about the priceless Punjab diamond being stolen from the museum  by an evil crook named Dapper Malone (Kenneth MacDonald). With dreams of becoming genuine reporters, the trio head for Squid McGuffy's cafe asking for the whereabouts of Dapper. They manage to convince everyone at the restaurant that they are actually police.

While searching several rooms above the cafe, the Stooges stumble on Dapper's moll, Bee (Christine McIntyre), who hastily hides the Punjab diamond in a candy dish. The boys refuse to leave, suspecting Dapper will eventually show his face. While killing time, Shemp starts to flirt with the moll, and manages to swallow the ice along with some mints from the candy dish. The gal nearly has a nervous breakdown but quickly discovers the Stooges are nothing more than reporters. She calls in Dapper and his henchman Muscles (Cy Schindell) and frantically try to pry the diamond out of frazzled Shemp.

After all else fails, Dapper decides to cut him open by performing some surgery on Shemp in the office. Moe and Larry are locked in a closet by Muscles while Shemp is tied down on a close by desk-turned-operating table. As luck would have it, there happens to be a bag of tools in the closet, which Moe and Larry use to saw their way out of the closet, and right into a gorilla named Harold's cage on the other side of the wall. The gorilla knocks Dapper and Muscles cold. The beast, however, befriends and saves Shemp, and helps him cough up the diamond.

Cast

Credited
 Moe Howard as Moe
 Larry Fine as Larry
 Shemp Howard as Shemp
 Kenneth MacDonald as Dapper Malone
 Christine McIntyre as Bee
 George C. Wilson as J. L. Cameron
 Lester Allen as Runty

Uncredited
 Cy Schindell as Muscles
 Ray "Crash" Corrigan as Harold the gorilla
 George Lloyd as Squid McGuffey
 Jimmy Aubrey as Hawkins
 Heinie Conklin as Bartender
 Blackie Whiteford as Seaman
 Joe Palma as Barfly

Production notes
Crime on Their Hands was filmed on September 9–12, 1947. The title Crime on Their Hands is a parody of the expression "time on their hands." The press room scene was recycled in 1956's Commotion on the Ocean, while the remaining portion of Crime on Their Hands was utilized in 1955's Hot Ice. It is a partial remake of the 1942 Andy Clyde short All Work and No Pay.

Crime on Their Hands marked the final appearance of longtime Stooge supporting actor Cy Schindell. Drafted into the Marines during World War II, Cy Schindell developed a severe case of jungle rot while on Guadalcanal, which eventually developed into terminal cancer. Knowing he was dying, Schindell worked constantly during his illness to assure his family would be financially secure after his death. Excessive makeup was used during the filming of Crime on Their Hands to mask Schindell's cancer-ridden face.

Crime on Their Hands was reworked from 1944's Step Lively starring George Murphy and Frank Sinatra, which in itself was a remake of Room Service with The Marx Brothers. (they left MGM for signed RKO), both were release by RKO,

References

External links 
 
 

1948 films
The Three Stooges films
1940s English-language films
American black-and-white films
Films directed by Edward Bernds
1948 comedy films
Columbia Pictures short films
American comedy films
1940s American films